Edward Theodore Newell (1886–1941) was a U.S. numismatist. He served as the president of the American Numismatic Society between 1916 and 1941. He was awarded the medal of the Royal Numismatic Society in 1925, the first American recipient. The American Journal of Archaeology called him "America's greatest numismatist."

References

External links 
 Brief biography of Newell
 Digital Library Numis (DLN) - E-books and papers by Edward Newell
 The Dating of the Coinage of Alexander the Great by Zoë Sophia Kontes

1886 births
1941 deaths
American numismatists
20th-century American historians
20th-century American male writers
American male non-fiction writers